The Baker Hotel is a historic site listed on the National Register of Historic Places located in Baker, Montana, at the southeast corner of Main Street and Railroad Avenue.  It was added to the Register on January 5, 2005.

The hotel was a two-story brick commercial building built in 1916 and opened in 1917.  In 2004, it was the second oldest brick building in Baker.  When listed in 2004, the building was owned by the City of Baker, and it had been vacant for 15 years.

The hotel has been destroyed and replaced by another building.

References

Hotel buildings on the National Register of Historic Places in Montana
National Register of Historic Places in Fallon County, Montana
1916 establishments in Montana
Hotel buildings completed in 1916
Demolished buildings and structures in Montana